Yi Jeong-am (1541 – September 10, 1600) was a Korean military official of the mid-Joseon Period.

Life 
Yi Jeong-am passed the licentiate examination in the fall of 1558 and passed the regular literary examination in 1561 as one of the third-tier passers. Starting his career with the Third Copyist of Diplomatic Documents Bureau (승문원부정자), he served in various internal affairs and assistant section chiefs of several ministries. The following year, he served as an auditor of Jeolla Province (전라도도사), and then returned to the court to serve as assistant section chief of Ministry of Justice (형조좌랑). In 1569, he moved to Gyeonggi Provincial Government and became a drafter of the Chunchugwan (춘추관기주관). The following year, he was reappointed to the assistant section chief of Ministry of Justice to serve as a King's Editor (지제교). Then, he was moved to Section Chief of Ministry of Military (병조정랑) and dispatched to Gangwon Province as a secret royal inspector to inspect the disaster area. In 1571, he participated in the compilation of the Veritable Records of Myeongjong. In 1572, he was appointed to Second Assistant Master of Sungkyunkwan (성균관사예) and observed the Chundangdae examination. In June of the same year, he became a prefect of Yonan and organized his military service.

After serving as prefect of Yonan, Jangdan and Pyongsan, he was appointed to the magistrate of Yangju in 1579. As the magistrate of Yangju, he reconstructed Dobong Seowon and county schools. He also reformed the rice field plans and implemented Uniform Land-Tax Law (대동법) in the entire area of Yangju. In 1583, he was selected as Jangnyeong (장령), Saseong (사성), and Jangakjeong (장악정) when Yi I recruited scholars and founded Chansucheong (찬수정). In 1587, he was designated as prefect of Dongnae to defend against the invasion of Japanese invaders. In 1591, he served as royal secretary (승지) and Councilor of Ministries of Public Works and Military affairs.

In January 1592, he was the Councilor of Ministry of Personnel (이조참의). When King Seonjo took refuge in Pyongan Province, he attempted to follow him. But he was late and he was already out of office and had no duty. He tried to defend Kaesong with his younger brother, Yi Jeong-hyeong, but failed due to the collapse of the Imjin River defense line. In April, he entered the Hwanghae Province, became a Suppressor (초토사), recruited righteous army, and entered the Yonan Fortress with them. When Japanese Army led by Kuroda Nagamasa invaded, he defeated the Japanese enemy and firmly defended the castle. With the credit, he became an Governor of Hwanghae Province. In 1593, he served as Second Minister of Military (병조참판), governor of Jeolla Province. However, after successfully defending the Yonan fortress, Yi proposed reinforcement negotiations to Seonjo, insisting on a quick end to the war, but was impeached and lost his official post. However, he was appointed to Deputy Magistrate of Jeonju (전주부윤) in July of the same year In 1596, he became the governor of Chungcheong Province and contributed to the repression of the Yi Mong-hak’s Rebellion. However, he was dismissed under the charge of arbitrarily punishing prisoners, and in December of that year, he concurrently served as the Fourth Minister of the Office of Ministers-without-Portfolio (동지중추부사) and governor of Hwanghae Province. In 1597, when the Second Japanese Invasion broke out, he protected Suyang Fortress of Haeju as a Suppressor of Hwanghae Province. After the Japanese invasions of Korea, he resigned from his official post and spent his last years writing several works in Jeongjujeongsa Temple in Pungdeok. He died on September 10, 1600.

After his death, various honors were bestowed upon him, including the title of Wolcheon Buwongun (월천부원군; 月川府院君), an enrollment as the second rank of Seonmu Merit Subjects (선무공신; 宣武功臣), and a posthumous offices, Jwauijeong (좌의정; 左議政).

See also 

 History of Korea
 Military history of Korea

References 

1541 births
1600 deaths
Korean generals
16th-century Korean people
People of the Japanese invasions of Korea (1592–1598)
Military history of Korea